Richard Anthony Lanahan (September 27, 1911 – March 12, 1975) was an American professional baseball pitcher. He played in Major League Baseball (MLB) for the Pittsburgh Pirates and Washington Senators in a four-year career varying from 1935 to 1941.

Lanahan's best season was the 1940 season in which he had six wins in 40 games, and a 4.25 earned run average. His forty games played was ninth in the National League.

References

External links

Pittsburgh Pirates players
Washington Senators (1901–1960) players
1911 births
1975 deaths
Baseball players from Washington, D.C.